The Mautner Project is a national organization in the United States dedicated to improve the health of lesbians and other women who partner with women (WPW). It was founded in 1990 and it is based in Washington, D.C. It provides direct services, engages in community outreach and health education campaigns, trains health care professionals to deliver culturally competent care, and raises awareness of lesbian and WPW health issues.

Statement and vision

“Mautner Project is committed to improving the health of women who partner with women including lesbian, bisexual and transgender individuals through direct and support services, education, and advocacy.”

Vision: "Mautner Project envisions a health care system that is respectful of and accessible to all without regard for their sexual orientation, gender identity, or gender expression. Our vision is a society in which all individuals are empowered with the knowledge to utilize these resources and to make appropriate choices for themselves."

Programs and services

The Client Services program coordinates resources for lesbians and WPW facing illness. Mautner Project assists clients with finding culturally competent health care, accessing care, and identifying support resources. Mautner Project also provides direct services to clients such as transportation to doctor appointments and facilitates support groups for WPW facing illness, the death of a loved one, or caregiving.

The Removing the Barriers Program is a training program designed to educate and bring awareness to healthcare providers about the healthcare needs of WPW.

S.H.E. Circle is the first national health education program focused on African American WPW. The local S.H.E. Circles are information networks where African American lesbian and bisexual women learn about health issues, ask questions, share information, connect with resources, and provide support to each other.

Mautner Project also provides health information to consumers and raises awareness of lesbian and WPW health issues via its website, information requests, and participation in community events.

History

Mautner Project was founded in 1990 following the death of Mary-Helen Mautner 1989 of breast cancer. Shortly before her death, Mautner asked her partner, Susan Hester, to start an organization that could help other lesbians facing the overwhelming challenges of life-threatening illnesses.

Mautner Project has engaged in the following collaborations:

 National Lesbian-Feminist Health Coalition projects (founded and facilitated)
 National Breast Cancer Coalition (co-founded, serves onboard)
 Training for the Centers for Disease Control and Prevention (CDC) and other agencies of the U.S. Department of Health and Human Services on culturally competent care for lesbians, bisexual and transgender women
 HEALING WORKS!: The National Conference on Lesbians and Cancer (founded and organized)
 Coming Out Of Cancer: Voices From The Lesbian Cancer Epidemic (Partnered with more than one hundred health organizations across the country to raise awareness of LGBT concerns related to cancer)
 National Policy Roundtable
 Lesbian Kisses (partnered with Mazzoni Center and The Safeguards Project)
 LGBTQ-NS Campaign (leading collaboration within the DC Tobacco-Free Families Campaign): smoking cessation campaign designed to engage LGBTQ community members.

In September 2009, Mautner Project was asked by the White House to send a client to sit with First Lady Michelle Obama during President Barack Obama's September 9 address to a joint session of Congress regarding health care reform.

Community partnerships

Mautner Project has formed multiple community partnerships to fulfill its mission. These partnerships include:

 DC Vote (since January 11, 2001)
 Capital Pride
 American Cancer Society

References

External links
 Mautner Project Official Website
 S.H.E. Circle Website
 Records of the Mautner Project, 1989-2010: A Finding Aid.Schlesinger Library , Radcliffe Institute, Harvard University.
 Video collection of the Mautner Project, 1990-2006: A Finding Aid.Schlesinger Library , Radcliffe Institute, Harvard University.

Lesbian organizations in the United States